All American Airways may refer to:

All American Aviation Company, later All American Airways, now US Airways
Saturn Airways, originally All American Airways, a charter airline